Wundersmith: The Calling of Morrigan Crow is an Australian fantasy novel written by Jessica Townsend as the second book in The Nevermoor series. The book was published by Lothian Books on October 30, 2018, in Australia and Orion Books in the United Kingdom, but Little, Brown on November 13, 2018, in the United States. Wundersmith follows young Morrigan Crow as she undergoes Nevermoorian schooling, becomes a part of the prestigious Wundrous Society, and deals with being a Wundersmith, a type of magician who can overtake the mysterious substance of Wunder.

Setting 
The book, like most of the entire series, is set in Nevermoor, a magical town with talking animal, superpowers, and steampunk gadgets and devices. Major locations in Nevermoor’s 27 boroughs include the Hotel Deucalion, Jupiter's home (along with Morrigan, Dame Chanda Kali, and others) and place of business, and the Wunsoc campus, the area in which the Wundrous Society operates. The name is the first three letters of each word combined.

Characters 

 Morrigan Odelle Crow: a young girl who was saved from her terrible fate on Eventide day by Jupiter North. She is also a Wundersmith (someone who can shape wunder).
 Jupiter North: the patron of Morrigan. He is the owner of the Deucalion Hotel and is the uncle of Jack Korrapati.
Hawthorne Swift: Morrigan's best friend who is also a member of Unit 919. He is a dragon rider.
John Arjuna Korrapati: Jupiter's nephew who dislikes Morrigan until this book when she befriends her.
Ezra Squall: the only other Wundersmith still alive who became a monster after massacring a large portion of Nevermoor on Courage Square 100 years ago. 
Angel Israfel: a singer whose voice is so enchanting it makes the rest of the lives of those who hear it seem anticlimactic.
 Dame Chanda Kali: a singer whose knack can let her call animals. She lives permanently in the Hotel Deucalion and serves as a friend to Morrigan.
Baz Charlton: the patron of the Charlton Five, a group of kids who often bully other, younger students including Morrigan.
Miss Cheery: the conductor of Unit 919's private hometrain that leads directly from their homes to the Wunsoc campus. She "lives up to her name," as Morrigan says in the book.
Hemingway Q. Onstald: Morrigan's only teacher besides Mildmay who she hates, until he sacrifices himself for her.
Unit 919: the newest unit of the Wundrous Society. Besides the seven following, Morrigan and Hawthorne are also members. In each unit there are nine children, who are bonded together like family:
Francis John Fitzwilliam: a gastronomist and cook forced to bake an intricate cake as part of the Wundrous Society's loyalty trial.
Mahir Ibrahim: a linguist blackmailed into writing inappropriate words all over Wunsoc campus in different languages.
Thaddea Millicent Macleod: a fighter who is forced to throw a game against an unskilled opponent lest Morrigan's secret be revealed.
Lambeth Amara: a "short-range" Oracle. Amara's full name is Princess Lamya Bethari Amati Ra, and she was smuggled in from the Wintersea Republic by her grandmother to avoid political attention.
Anah Kahlo: a skilled doctor blackmailed into stealing medical supplies as part of the Loyalty Trial.
Cadence Lenore Blackburn: a mesmerist who keeps making the other members of Unit 919 forget who she is; only Morrigan is immune to her powers.
Archan Tate: a pickpocket who is very sly and stealthy.
Mildmay: a geography teacher who turned out to be working for Ezra Squall.

Plot 
Jupiter North - Morrigan Crow's patron and caretaker - takes her to a performance of the Angel Israfel, whose singing is so beautiful that the lives of those who listen to him will seem anticlimactic after they hear his song. Israfel is initially pleased when Jupiter and Morrigan arrive, but his mood turns sour when Jupiter tells him that they have only come to ask for a favor. They also learn that another great singer, Cassiel, has gone missing, which is bad for Israfel's business. Jupiter tells Israfel that he needs him to become a signatory and sign a safest that will allow Morrigan, the newest Wundersmith, to remain in Nevermoor legally. After they leave, Jupiter admits that he has been planning Morrigan a twelfth birthday party, and promises that it will be low-key until they arrive at Jupiter's place of business, the Hotel Deucalion, and Jupiter makes it a big production. Morrigan is touched, since nobody had ever thrown her a birthday party when she was in her homeland, Jackalfax, since she was a "cursed" child. The elders and patron discuss Morrigan being a Wundersmith, but even though Baz Charlton and Nan Dawson don't want Morrigan in the Wundrous Society Unit 919, Jupiter insists that being a Wundersmith doesn't make one evil; Ezra Squall just "happened to be a Wundersmith and a sociopath." That night, Morrigan discovers a new door in her hotel room, and ventures through to see a train station that is only for Unit 919. The others discover it too, and they are introduced to everything in the Wundrous Society by Miss Cheery. Cheery explains that the society is split into two schools: Mundane and Arcane; each school thinks they are better than the other. Originally, Unit 919 was supposed to be given a tour of the Wunsoc campus, but their tour leader, Paximus Luck, has gone missing like Cassiel, which greatly worries Morrigan. Morrigan shows her schedule to the Scholar Mistress, the principal of the school, who dislikes all her classes because they are training her to be dangerous. She sets Morrigan up with only one class, which she attends all day every day. The class is a history of all heinous crimes committed by Wundersmiths, taught by Professor Hemingway Q. Onstald, a wunimal turtle who makes her read from a book entitled Missteps, Blunders, Fiascoes, Monstroities, and Devastations.

Onstald tries to convince Morrigan that she is already evil like the rest of the Wundersmiths and is beyond saving, but Morrigan leaves school early to voice her grievances to Jupiter, who tells her that Onstald is obviously biased and only wrote about the bad things Wundersmiths have done because it is his book, and is able to get another class on Morrigan's schedule, about navigating the city of Nevermoor. Morrigan warms up to both the teacher, Mildway, and the class. After a terrifying encounter with the Charlton Five, bullies whose patron is Baz Charlton, who want her to reveal her knack even though the Elders specified that she mustn't. A note also appears for Unit 919, telling them that they must meet certain demands, that Thaddea must lose a boxing match and Francis must bake a cake for them, and if they don't meet the demands exactly, whoever sent the note will reveal the dreadful secret of Unit 919. Everyone assumes it is Morrigan sending the notes being a Wundersmith and all. Morrigan learns about Tricksy Lanes, a way to get across town more quickly, but also more dangerously, in her map class, and they even take a field trip to see one. There, Morrigan powers on to try to see what's on the other side of the lane, and watch two men in the Devilish Court discussing the Ghastly Market, a fable market where even living things can be bought, and she starts looking into the mystery, thinking that those who disappeared could have been taken there. Due to the blackmail, part of the Unit starts to grow away from Morrigan, thinking that it’s her fault that they have to go through so much trouble to meet the demands. Then, to make matters worse, one of the Charlton Five attacks Morrigan thinking that she did something to make Alfie, another member of the group who recently disappeared, leave. Miss Cheery comes to her rescue. Heloise, the girl, harms her and Morrigan spontaneously breathes fire sending Heloise to the hospital.

The Elders are very displeased with her and ban her from Wunsoc campus, making her attend classes from home. Morrigan visits the Nevermoor Bazaar which is set up only once a year, with Cadence and Hawthorne and his family including his brother Homer, who took a vow of silence, but wanders off into a restricted part of the bazaar and ends up in the Ghastly Market, proving that it is real. There, she finds Alfie Swann, the member of the Charlton Five who disappeared, and returns him home, though he has apparently lost his knack. Later, upon starting Wundrous Society lessons at home, Morrigan finds that the staff of the Hotel Deucalion are purposefully trying to annoy Professor Onstald, and is accepted back into the society. For her map class, Morrigan must navigate the streets of Nevermoor for one and a half hours with two other members of Unit 919, Francis and Mahir, without using any means of transport besides their own feet. Morrigan gets separated from her classmates and ends up getting lost. She is found and approached by the Hunt of Smoke and Shadow, who instead of fighting her take her to see Squall again. He teaches her to control the Wunder around her, but she demands to leave after Squall notes that she is becoming more and more like him. She returns to the Hotel Deucalion, where Jupiter has just gotten back from one of his increasingly frequent Wundrous Society trips. She informs him of her newfound power, and he warns her to be careful with it. Later, Jupiter takes Morrigan to Jemmity Park, an amusement park created by Odbouy Jemmity, a Wundersmith. On its opening day, the gates never let anyone in, and it was named a fiasco. However, it did open, but just for the children who deserved to play in it, and was named a singularity.

Later, on Hallowmas Eve, Morrigan confronts Professor Onstald about what she saw, and when she threatens to expose him as a fraud for putting false information in his book, he stops time temporarily, as his knack is called “Timekeeper.” When he is taken like all the other members and animals that have disappeared, the Black Parade is cancelled, and to make up for it, Jupiter hosts a séance on the roof of the Deucalion. However, Squall arrives once more, telling her that Candence and Lambeth, members of her Unit, are being sold on the Ghastly Market, along with Onstald and the Angel Israfel. Morrigan and Hawthorne arrive at the Ghastly Market where it is revealed that Lambeth is actually a deserter of the Wintersea Republic, a crime punishable by death. Morrigan uses her Wundersmith abilities to destroy the Ghastly Market once and for all, saving her friends, but Onstald stays behind, sacrificing himself for Morrigan and the others. At a Wundrous Society assembly, Morrigan gets blackmailed to reveal herself as a Wundersmith or Lambeth’s secret will be revealed and she will likely be killed. Morrigan debates revealing her own secret, but then decides that it is the right thing to do. After telling the crowd, it is revealed that the demands were only a trust exercise for Unit 919 to make sure they could function as a team.

Reception 
The book was well received on Common Sense Media and Goodreads, with reviewers commenting on how relatable the book was to Harry Potter, like the last installment. Also, reviews on the website noted that "Morrigan's story felt a bit darker" in addition to the fact that the "stakes were higher too." Reviews on Google Books were rave, saying that it is "a great book for all the family, a new book in the world of Nevermoor!" A review on Booking In Heels admitted that the novel has "Middle Book Syndrome" in that it does not advance the plot. "In short, it’s an unnecessary book, but a really enjoyable one."

Sequels 

The third book in the series, Hollowpox: The Hunt for Morrigan Crow, was announced on May 31, 2019. The book is the second installation in The Nevermoor series, the first being Nevermoor: The Trials of Morrigan Crow. Hollowpox was released on September 29, 2020 in Australia, October 15, 2020 in the United Kingdom, and October 27, 2020 in the United States, to rave reviews. An untitled fourth novel has been announced, and though only six books in the entire were officially announced, author Townsend reported that she has plots planned out for a nine-book series.

References 

2018 Australian novels
Australian fantasy novels
Little, Brown and Company books
Lothian Books books
Orion Books books